The AWGIE Awards is an annual awards ceremony conducted by the Australian Writers' Guild, for excellence in screen, television, stage and radio writing. The awards began in 1967.

The awards are judged by over 50 writers, most of whom are previous award winners themselves. They receive no payment for their role as judges. The judges sign a confidentiality agreement, stating that they will not disclose to anyone that they are members of the judging panel.

Award categories

As of 2018, award categories include:

Major AWGIE
Awarded to the outstanding script of that year across all categories

Feature film
Screenplay Original
Screenplay Adaptation

Short Film
Short Film

Television
Serial
Series
Mini Series Original
Mini Series Adaptation
Telemovie Original
Telemovie Adaptation
Drama or Comedy, Other Form (Television or Alternate Platforms)

Children's Television
Pre-school (under 5 years)
Children's (5–14 years)

Comedy
Comedy – Situation or Narrative
Comedy – Sketch or Light Entertainment

Theatre
Stage
Community and Youth Theatre
Theatre for Young Audiences
Children's Theatre
Music Theatre

Radio
Original
Adaptation

Interactive Media
Interactive Media

Animation
Animation

Documentary
Public Broadcast or Exhibition
Corporate & Training

Monte Miller Award for an unproduced script by an Associate Member
Short Form
Long Form

Notable winners
Richard Lane - won four AWGIES. The Richard Lane Award has been awarded annually since 1988 for an outstanding contribution to the Guild.
Cliff Green - Medal of the Order of Australia (June 2009)
Geoffrey Atherden - Member of the Order Of Australia (Jan 2009)
Nick Pearce - The Forgotten City - First video game mod to have received a screenwriters award

References

External links
Awgie Awards website

 
Australian literary awards
Australian film awards
Awards established in 1967